Edward John Vosberg (born September 28, 1961) is a former left-handed relief pitcher in Major League Baseball who had a 10-year career (1986, 1990, 1994–1997, 1999–2002). He played with the San Diego Padres, San Francisco Giants, Florida Marlins, Arizona Diamondbacks, Philadelphia Phillies and Montreal Expos in the National League, and the Oakland A's and Texas Rangers in the American League.  He is currently the pitching coach for the Tucson Toros.

He is one of only three players (Jason Varitek and Michael Conforto are the others) to play in the Little League World Series, the College World Series, and the Major League World Series, and is the only pitcher to have done so. He played first base for Tucson, Arizona in the 1973 Little League World Series final. He pitched a one-hitter in the semifinals against Birmingham, Michigan. He played for the 1980 NCAA champion University of Arizona. He then played for the Florida Marlins in the 1997 Major League World Series.

Career
Edward John Vosberg was drafted by the San Diego Padres in the 3rd round of the 1983 MLB draft. He began his professional career with the single A Reno Padres in the California League. Whilst with Reno he showed promise going 6-6 and sporting a 3.87 earned run average. After only 15 games with the single A Reno Padres he was called up to the AA Beaumount Golden Gators. His brief stint there in 1983 yielded one game where he went 7.0 shutout innings only giving up 2 hits with 2 walks and 1 strikeout. Vosberg stayed in AA with the Golden Gators for the 1984 season improving to a 13–11 record with an earned run average of 3.43 and 100 strikeouts.

He was promoted to the AAA roster in 1986 to the Las Vegas Stars where he went 7–8 with an earned run average of 4.72. He also made his major league debut in 1986 on September 18 at the age of 24. He pitched in 5 games in 13 innings going 0–1 with an earned run average of 6.59. He returned to the AAA Las Vegas Stars for the 1987 season. In December 1988 he was traded to the Houston Astros for Dan Walters. Vosberg remained in the Astros' system until 1989 when he was traded to the Dodgers and assigned to AAA Albuquerque. He became a free agent in 1990 and signed with the San Francisco Giants. During the 1990 season, Edward returned to the major league level. He pitched in 18 games with 24 innings pitched and an inflated 5.55 earned run average.  He was granted free agency after the 1990 season and spent the next 4 years in the minors with the Angels, Mariners, Cubs, and Athletics organizations and even played in the Italian League in 1992.

In 1994 he returned to the majors once again with the Oakland Athletics. He pitched in 16 games with a record of 0-2 and an earned run average of 3.95. After the 1994 season Vosberg was drafted by the Los Angeles Dodgers in the Supplemental Rule 5 draft. He was out righted to the minors shortly after and refused the Minor League assignment and became a free agent. He then signed a minor league contract with the Rangers organization. The Rangers purchased his contract and Vosberg once again returned to the big leagues. He pitched in 44 games out of the bullpen and put up his best numbers 5–5 and an earned run average of 3.00. He returned to the Texas Rangers in 1996 and had another respectable season out of the Ranger's bullpen going 1–1 with an ERA of 3.27 and finishing 21 games. 1997 was his final season as a Texas Ranger he was traded to the Florida Marlins for Rick Helling. His overall record with both clubs in 1997 was 2 wins 3 losses 1 save and an earned run average of 4.42 As a member of the 1997 Florida Marlins, Vosberg won a World Series ring. He pitched in the postseason and had 5 strikeouts and giving up 5 hits and 3 walks. His earned run average in the 1997 World Series was 6.00.

After his stint with the Marlins, he was traded to the San Diego Padres for minor leaguer Chris Clark on November 20, 1997. He missed the 1998 season due to injury and did not pitch at all. At the age of 37, Vosberg returned to the majors and played with the San Diego Padres. His time with the Padres was limited and his numbers were terrible. His record with the Padres was 0-0 with an earned run average of 9.72. He sustained a shoulder injury and was placed on the 15-day disabled list. A few months after rehab, he was released by the Padres on June 7, 1999. He was picked up by the Arizona Diamondbacks a few days later on June 18, 1999. His numbers improved with the move to Arizona, going 0–1 with am earned run average of 3.38 in four games. His entire Arizona Diamondback career was those 4 games. He was designated for assignment once more. He returned to the minor league with yet another organization: The Colorado Rockies.

At the age of 38, the Rockies traded Ed Vosberg to the Philadelphia Phillies on June 28, 2000, in part of a conditional deal. He once again found his way onto a major league roster with the Phillies in 2000. He went 1–1 in 31 games with an earned run average of 4.13. He played in 2001 with the Phillies and put up his best earned run average in his career at a 2.84 clip out of the Phillies’ bullpen. However, once again after the 2001 season he was granted free agency and picked up by the Montreal Expos. His Canadian career was short-lived, only pitching in four games and stacking up an earned run average of 18.00. On April 18, 2002, Vosberg refused a minor league assignment and became a free agent once more.

He made a comeback attempt in the Mexican leagues in 2006–07 at the age of 45. Ed Vosberg was quoted as saying, "The last couple of years I have gotten the itch. When I retired five years ago I think I still could have done it physically, but mentally it is such a grind. It is such a great life, but it is a grind. It is difficult being away from your family. I needed these years to get the love of the game back and get on the field again." In his final seasons in the Mexican leagues he had a combined record of 7–8 with an earned run average of 4.14.

References

External links

1961 births
Living people
Albuquerque Dukes players
American expatriate baseball players in Canada
Arizona Diamondbacks players
Arizona Wildcats baseball players
Baseball players from Tucson, Arizona
Beaumont Golden Gators players
Calgary Cannons players
Colorado Springs Sky Sox players
Competitors at the 1981 World Games
Edmonton Trappers players
Florida Marlins players
Iowa Cubs players
Las Vegas Stars (baseball) players
Major League Baseball pitchers
Montreal Expos players
Oakland Athletics players
Oklahoma City 89ers players
Philadelphia Phillies players
Phoenix Firebirds players
Reno Padres players
San Diego Padres players
San Francisco Giants players
Scranton/Wilkes-Barre Red Barons players
Tacoma Tigers players
Texas Rangers players
Tucson Sidewinders players
Tucson Toros players
World Games gold medalists
American expatriate baseball players in Italy
Algodoneros de Guasave players
American expatriate baseball players in Mexico
Diablos Rojos del México players
Guerreros de Oaxaca players
Potros de Tijuana players
Anchorage Glacier Pilots players